"The Girls of Llanbadarn", or "The Ladies of Llanbadarn" (Welsh: Merched Llanbadarn), is a short, wryly humorous poem by the 14th-century Welsh poet Dafydd ap Gwilym, in which he mocks his own lack of success with the girls of his neighbourhood.  Dafydd is widely seen as the greatest of the Welsh poets, and this is one of his best-known works.   The poem cannot be precisely dated, but was perhaps written in the 1340s.

Summary

Dafydd curses the women of his parish, and complains that he has never had any luck with any of them.  He wonders what is lacking in him or in them that none of them will agree to meet him in the woods.  Comparing himself to Garwy he says that he has always been in love with some girl or other but never won her, and confesses that every Sunday he can be found in church, with his head turned over his shoulder and away from the body of Christ, gazing at some girl.  Dafydd represents such a woman as exchanging with her friend gibes about his appearance and character.  The poet concludes that he must give all this up and go off alone to be a hermit, since, though his ogling habits have literally turned his head, he still has no girl.

Commentary

Dafydd often refers to Llanbadarn in his poems, reflecting the fact that he was born at Brogynin, in the parish of Llanbadarn Fawr, and lived there for many years.  He shows his knowledge of Welsh legend with his reference to Garwy Hir, who was renowned as a lover, and whose daughter was herself loved by King Arthur.  The line in which the poet is said to be "Pale and with his sister's hair" are consistent with a third-hand description of Dafydd given in a 16th-century document: "tall and slender, with long curly yellow hair, full of silver clasps and rings".  It has been suggested that the first of Dafydd's two disparagers is the woman whom in many other poems he calls Morfudd, the object of his often rejected devotion.

Theme and analogues

The poem's theme, Dafydd's habitual failure in love, is a very common one in his work.  As the novelist and scholar Gwyn Jones wrote:

No lover in any language, and certainly no poet, has confessed to missing the mark more often than Dafydd ap Gwilym.  Uncooperative husbands, quick-triggered alarms, crones and walls, strong locks, floods and fogs and bogs and dogs are for ever interposing themselves between him and golden-haired Morfudd, black-browed Dyddgu, or Gwen the infinitely fair.  But a great trier, even in church.

Parallels to Dafydd's amused and ironic reportage of his own inadequacies can be found in Chaucer's works, and elsewhere in medieval literature; also in the poems of Dafydd's avowed model Ovid.  But Dafydd is also, more seriously, pointing up the superficiality of the girls' criticism of his appearance as compared with an implied judgement of his true worth.

Poetic art

In common with other Middle Welsh poems of the form called cywyddau "The Girls of Llanbadarn" follows complex rules of construction.  It uses the system of alliteration and internal rhyme known as cynghanedd, except in the lines recording the comments of the two girls, where, in contrast with the rest of the poem, the diction is plain and conversational.  Sangiad, the breaking-up of the syntactical structure of the sentence, is used in most of the poem.  The scholar Joseph Clancy illustrated this with a literal translation of the last lines, in which the second half of each line interrupts the narrative flow with the poet's commentary on it:

From too much looking, strange lesson,Backwards, sight of weakness,It happened to me, strong song's friend,To bow my head without one companion.

Influence 

The 20th-century Welsh poet Raymond Garlick wrote a poem, "Llanbadarn Etc.", inspired by "The Girls of Llanbadarn" and addressed to a contemporary who, though displaying behaviour similar to that depicted in Dafydd ap Gwilym's poem, has

no words now to crown it withor turn it to a cywydd.

English translations and paraphrases

 Bell, H. Idris, in   With the Middle Welsh original in parallel text.
   With the Middle Welsh original in parallel text.
   With the Middle Welsh original in parallel text.
 
 Rev. repr. in his 
 
 Edwards, Huw Meirion.  At   With the Middle Welsh original.
 
 
 
 
 
 Humphries, Rolfe.  
 Repr. in his 
 
 
 
 
 Rev repr. in 
 
 Rev. repr. in   With the Middle Welsh original in parallel text.

Notes

References

External links
 Full text in Middle Welsh at Welsh Wikisource
 The Joseph Clancy translation
 The Kenneth Hurlstone Jackson translation.

14th-century poems
Aberystwyth
Humorous poems
Poetry by Dafydd ap Gwilym
14th-century Welsh women